John Carr (26 November 1892 – 10 May 1942) was an English professional footballer. He made 449 league appearances for Middlesbrough, scoring 81 times. He was also capped twice for England.

Playing career

Club career
Born in South Bank, near Middlesbrough, Carr signed a professional contract with his hometown club on 25 January 1911, after having already played as an amateur. He had four brothers, all of whom played for Middlesbrough: Walter and Harry, who signed as amateurs, and Willie and George, who both signed professional contracts for the club.

His debut came on 2 January 1911 against Nottingham Forest in a 2–2 draw. Carr scored both goals in front of a crowd of 15,000. That was the only appearance he made that season, his next game not coming until 27 January 1912. He made only three further appearances that season, scoring one goal.

Carr made his mark the following season with 16 goals in 30 appearances, before going on to score 59 further times for Middlesbrough.

After 20 years of service to Middlesbrough, Carr was transferred to Blackpool on 14 May 1930, for the sum of £500. He spent a season at Blackpool before moving on to Hartlepools United in 1931, firstly as player/coach and retired as a player in 1932.

International career
Carr was capped twice for England. His debut, against Ireland in Belfast on 25 October 1919, ended in a 1–1 draw, and his second and final cap came four years later against Wales at Cardiff on 5 March 1923. The game finished 2–2.

Managerial career
Carr started his managerial career as a player/coach at Hartlepools United in 1931. He took over as manager in 1932.

Carr was subsequently manager at Tranmere Rovers (1935–1936) and Darlington (1938–1942).

References

External links 

England profile

1892 births
People from South Bank, Redcar and Cleveland
1942 deaths
English footballers
Middlesbrough F.C. players
Blackpool F.C. players
Hartlepool United F.C. players
England international footballers
English football managers
Hartlepool United F.C. managers
Tranmere Rovers F.C. managers
Darlington F.C. managers
English Football League players
English Football League representative players
English Football League managers
South Bank F.C. players
Footballers from Yorkshire
Brentford F.C. wartime guest players
Association football wing halves
Hartlepool United F.C. non-playing staff